Young Woman Powdering Herself (French: Jeune femme se poudrant) is an oil on canvas painting executed between 1889–90, by the French painter Georges Seurat. The work, one of the leading examples of pontillism, depicts the artist's mistress Madeleine Knobloch. It is in the collection of the Courtauld Institute of Art and on display in the Gallery at Somerset House. The painting is now back on display at the Courtald.

Seurat kept his relationship with his artist's model Knobloch secret. His relationship to the sitter was concealed when it was exhibited in 1890.

Hidden self-portrait
Since the painting was publicly shown, the wall behind the young woman had displayed a bamboo picture frame showing a vase of flowers. In 2014 using advanced image technology, it was revealed that Seurat had painted himself at his easel, the object on the wall is now believed to be a mirror. After showing the painting to a friend, Seurat painted over the portrait with a table and flowers. Ironically, this concealed portrait is the only known self-portrait made by Seurat.

See also
List of paintings by Georges Seurat

References

External links

Paintings by Georges Seurat
1890 paintings
Paintings in the collection of the Courtauld Institute of Art
Portraits of women